R503 road may refer to:
 R503 road (Ireland)
 R503 road (South Africa)